Menahan Street Band is a Brooklyn, New York-based instrumental band formed in 2007, that plays funk and soul music. The band features musicians from Antibalas, El Michels Affair, Sharon Jones & The Dap-Kings and the Budos Band. The group was founded by Thomas Brenneck while living in an apartment on Menahan Street in the Brooklyn neighborhood of Bushwick. Their debut album, Make the Road by Walking, was released in 2008 on Dunham, a sublabel of Daptone Records.

Various songs from Make the Road by Walking have been sampled by hip hop artists, including the title track, which was sampled by Jay-Z on the track "Roc Boys (And the Winner Is)...", "Going The Distance", which was sampled by Kid Cudi on his song "Solo Dolo Pt.II" featuring Kendrick Lamar on Cudi's third studio album Indicud, and "The Traitor," sampled by 50 Cent on his mixtape War Angel LP and by Cudi on his debut album Man on the Moon: The End of Day. In addition, the song "Tired of Fighting" is used as a primary sample in Kendrick Lamar's "Faith" from his eponymous 2009 EP, as well as YBN Cordae's 2019 track "Family Matters" from his debut album The Lost Boy.

After a ten-year hiatus, the band announced in December 2020 a new album, The Exciting Sounds of Menahan Street Band, to be released in February 2021.

Members 
All members are active on the Daptone roster, and most have played together in Sharon Jones & the Dap-Kings, El Michels Affair, The Budos Band, and/or Antibalas, among other projects.
 Thomas Brenneck – bandleader, guitar, bass, keyboards (2007–present)
 Dave Guy – trumpet, guitar (2007–present)
 Leon Michels – saxophone, woodwinds, organ (2007–present)
 Nick Movshon – bass, percussion (2007–present)
 Homer Steinweiss – drums (2007–present)
 Mike Deller – organ, piano (2007–2017; contributing musician: 2017–present)

Discography

Studio albums

Collaborative albums 

 Charles Bradley – No Time For Dreaming (2011)
 Charles Bradley – No Time For Dreaming (The Instrumentals) (2011)
 Charles Bradley – Victim of Love (2013)
 Charles Bradley – Changes (2016)
 Charles Bradley – Changes (The Instrumentals) (2017)
The Sha La Das – Love In The Wind (2018)
 Charles Bradley – Black Velvet (2018)
 Charles Bradley – Black Velvet (The Instrumentals) (2019)

Singles

{| class="wikitable plainrowheaders" style="text-align:center;" 
|-
! Title
! Year
! Album
! Format
|-
! scope="row" | "Make the Road by Walking" / "Karina"
| 2006
| Make the Road by Walking
| 7"
|-
! scope="row" | "The World (Is Going Up In Flames)" / "Heartaches and Pain"
| 2007
| rowspan="2" | No Time for Dreaming (with Charles Bradley)
| 7"
|-
! scope="row" | "The Telephone Song" / "Tired Of Fighting"
| 2008
| 7"
|-
! scope="row" | "The Wolf" / "Bushwick Lullaby"
| 2009
|
| 7"
|-
! scope="row" | "Heart Of Gold" / "In You (I Found A Love)"
| rowspan="3" | 2011
| rowspan="2" | No Time for Dreaming (with Charles Bradley)
| 7"
|-
! scope="row" |"No Time for Dreaming" / "Golden Rule"
|7"
|-
! scope="row" | "The Crossing" / "Everyday A Dream"
| rowspan="2" | The Crossing
| 7"
|-
! scope="row"| "Lights Out / Keep Coming Back"
| 2012
| 7"
|-
! scope="row"|"There's a New Day Coming" / "Tommy Don't"
|2019
| |7", digital
|-
! scope="row" |"Queen's Highway"
| rowspan="2" |2020
| rowspan="5" |The Exciting Sounds of Menahan Street Band|digital
|-
! scope="row" |"Midnight Morning" / "Stepping Through the Shadow"
|7"
|-
! scope="row" | "The Duke" / "Midnight Morning"
| rowspan="3" |2021
|7", digital
|-
! scope="row"| "The Starchaser"
|digital
|-
! scope="row"| "Devil's Respite"
|digital
|}

 Split singles 

 Australian Tour EP b/w Charles Bradley (2009)
 "Run it Back" b/w Charles Bradley (2012)
 "I'll Slip Away" (Charles Bradley & Menahan Street Band) b/w Rodriguez (2012)
 "Revelations" b/w Charles Bradley (2016)
 "How Did I Get Here?" b/w Larose Jackson (2021)

 Guest appearances 
Selected credits

 Jay-Z – "Roc Boys (And The Winner Is)..." (American Gangster, 2007) (sampled artist)
 Kid Cudi – "Solo Dolo" (Man on the Moon: The End of Day, 2009) (sampled artist)
50 Cent – "Talking in Codes" (War Angel LP, 2009) (sampled artist)
Kendrick Lamar – "Faith" (featuring BJ the Chicago Kid and Punch) (Kendrick Lamar EP, 2009) (sampled artist)
CeeLo Green – "Georgia" (single, 2010)
 3 Titans – "College" / "The Life of a Scholar" (single, 2010)
 Eminem – "Groundhog Day" (The Marshall Mathers LP 2, 2012) (sampled artist)
 Cults – "Go Outside (Menahan Street Band Remix)" (Cults, 2013)
Kid Cudi – "Solo Dolo, Part II" (featuring Kendrick Lamar) (Indicud, 2013) (sampled artist)
 Theophilus London – "Rio" (feat. Menahan Street Band) (single, 2013)
 Elvis Costello & The Roots – "Tripwire (Menahan Street Band Rework)" (Wise Up: Thought (Remixes & Reworks 2013) (Number Two), 2013)

Ludacris – "Not Long" (featuring Usher) (Ludaversal, 2015) (sampled artist)
 Charles Bradley & Menahan Street Band – "Cumberland Blues" (Grateful Dead cover) (Day of the Dead, 2016)
YBN Cordae – "Family Matters" (The Lost Boy,'' 2019) (sampled artist)

References

External links
Menahan Street Band @ Daptone Records
Daptone Records

American funk musical groups
American soul musical groups
Musical groups established in 2007
Musical groups from Brooklyn
Daptone Records artists